Sergio Peña (born February 13, 1993) is an American professional stock car racing driver. He competed in what is now the ARCA Menards Series East for seven years from 2010 to 2016. In addition, he has made starts in the West Series and was a member of NASCAR's Drive for Diversity program.

Racing career
Peña's father bought him a dirt bike at age 4. He began racing at age 13, driving motocross, go-karts, and Formula cars, which included competing in the Formula BMW series.

In 2010, Peña started racing stock cars, and joined Revolution Racing for his rookie season in the NASCAR K&N Pro Series East. He was also named as one of eleven drivers to be part of the Drive for Diversity program for that year. At the start of the season, Peña impressed people with his second-place finish in the Toyota All-Star Showdown, where he started on the pole and finished second in the race behind NASCAR Cup Series driver Joey Logano. He would finish twelfth in the standings with three top tens. He won three times in 2011 and finished fifth in the series.

Peña competed in his third K&N East season in 2012, moving to Hattori Racing Enterprises to driving the No. 1 car. Peña ran a limited NASCAR touring schedule in 2013, before returning full-time to the K&N East Series for 2014. He collected his fourth series win at Columbus.

In the late 2010s, Peña raced late model stock cars at Dominion Raceway.

Personal life
Peña is a first generation Colombian-American and lives in Virginia with his family. His father Jai was instrumental in helping Peña reach NASCAR, spending over a million dollars to help fund his son's career.

Motorsports career results

NASCAR
(key) (Bold – Pole position awarded by qualifying time. Italics – Pole position earned by points standings or practice time. * – Most laps led.)

K&N Pro Series East

K&N Pro Series West

References

External links
 
 NASCAR Home Tracks Profile

1993 births
Formula BMW USA drivers
Living people
NASCAR drivers
People from Winchester, Virginia
Racing drivers from Virginia
American sportspeople of Colombian descent